Hordabø is a former municipality in the old Hordaland county, Norway.  The  municipality, which existed from 1924 until 1964, was located on the northern part of the island of Radøy in the present-day Alver Municipality. The administrative centre was the village of Bøvågen, where Hordabø Church is located.

History
On 1 July 1924, the old Manger Municipality was split into three separate municipalities: Bø in the northern part, (a much smaller) Manger in the central part, and Sæbø in the southern part.  The municipality, which was known as Bø at that time, had a population of 1,938.  On 13 March 1925 the name was changed by royal resolution from Bø to Hordabø.

During the 1960s, there were many municipal mergers across Norway due to the work of the Schei Committee. On 1 January 1964, the municipality was dissolved and a merged with the following places to form the new Radøy Municipality.
all Hordabø Municipality (population: 1,679)
all Manger Municipality (population: 1,344)
the island of Bognøy from Herdla Municipality (population: 29)
most of Sæbø Municipality, except the Titland area on the Lindås peninsula (population: 916)
the Sletta area on the island of Radøy from Lindås Municipality (population: 305)
the Straume area on the island of Radøy and the small island of Fesøy from Austrheim Municipality (population: 56)

Government

Municipal council
The municipal council  of Hordabø was made up of 19 representatives that were elected to four year terms.  The party breakdown of the final municipal council was as follows:

See also
List of former municipalities of Norway

References

Alver (municipality)
Former municipalities of Norway
1924 establishments in Norway
1964 disestablishments in Norway